was a  after Genroku and before Shōtoku. This period spanned the years from March 1704 through April 1711.

Change of era
 1704 : In reaction to the Great Genroku earthquake in Genroku 16, the era name was changed to Hōei (meaning "Prosperous Eternity"). The previous era ended and the new one commenced in Genroku 17, on the 13th day of the 3rd month.

Events of the Hōei era
 October 28, 1707 (Hōei 4, 4th day of the 10th month): Great Hōei earthquake. The city of Osaka suffers tremendously because of a very violent earthquake.
 December 16, 1707 (Hōei 4, 23rd day of the 11th month): An eruption of Mount Fuji; the cinders and ash fell like rain in Izu, Kai, Sagami, and Musashi.
 April 28, 1708 (Hōei 5, 8th day of the 3rd month): There was a great fire in Heian-kyō.
 May 20, 1708 (Hōei 5, 1st day of the 4th month): The shogunate introduces new copper coins into circulation; and each coin is marked with the Hōei nengō name (Hōei Tsubo).
 October 12, 1708 (Hōei 5, 29th day of the 8th month):  Italian missionary Giovanni Sidotti landed in Yakushima, where he was promptly arrested.
 February 19, 1709 (Hōei 6, 10th day of the 1st month): The wife of Shōgun Tsunayoshi killed him with a knife, and then she stabbed herself in the heart. Tsunayoshi's homosexual interests were aroused by the son of the daimyō of Kai; and his plans to adopt this Tokugawa youth as his successor were known by a few inside Edo Castle. The shōgun's wife, who was also a daughter of the emperor, foresaw that this choice of a successor would be very poorly received by many; and she feared that it might result in a disastrous civil war. The shōgun's wife did everything she could to dissuade Tsunayoshi from continuing with such potentially divisive and dangerous plans; and when it became clear that her arguments were in vain, she resolutely sacrificed herself for the good of the country—she killed her husband and then killed herself. She may also have done this as she hated the boy.
 1709 (Hōei 6, 4th month): Minamoto no Ienobu, Tsunayoshi's nephew, becomes the 6th shōgun of the Edo bakufu.
 August 7, 1709 (Hōei 6, 2nd day of the 7th month): The Emperor abdicates.
 January 16, 1710 (Hōei 6, 17th day of the 12th month): Higashiyama dies.
 July 7, 1710 – March 22, 1711 (Hōei 7, 11th day of the 6th month – Shōtoku 1, 4th day of the 2nd month): Ryukyuan mission to Edo, the largest delegation—168 people—in the Edo Period.

Gallery

See also
 Hōei eruption of Mount Fuji
 Historic eruptions of Mount Fuji

Notes

References
 Nussbaum, Louis Frédéric and Käthe Roth. (2005). Japan Encyclopedia. Cambridge: Harvard University Press. ; OCLC 48943301
 Screech, Timon. (2006). Secret Memoirs of the Shoguns: Isaac Titsingh and Japan, 1779-1822. London: RoutledgeCurzon. ; OCLC 65177072
 Titsingh, Isaac. (1834). Nihon Odai Ichiran; ou,  Annales des empereurs du Japon.  Paris: Royal Asiatic Society, Oriental Translation Fund of Great Britain and Ireland. OCLC 5850691.

External links 
 National Diet Library, "The Japanese Calendar" -- historical overview plus illustrative images from library's collection

Japanese eras
1700s in Japan
1710s in Japan